The Arthur Lakes Log House, located at 401 Lakes Creek Rd. in McKee, Kentucky, was built in about 1890.  It was listed on the National Register of Historic Places in 2000.

It was built of oak logs on the bottom, tulip poplar in the middle, and pine logs at the top, with half-dove tail notching.

References

Houses on the National Register of Historic Places in Kentucky
Houses completed in 1890
National Register of Historic Places in Jackson County, Kentucky
Log houses in the United States
Log buildings and structures on the National Register of Historic Places in Kentucky
1890 establishments in Kentucky
Double pen architecture in the United States